Ghost Bird is a 2009 documentary centered on the small town of Brinkley, Arkansas. It deals with the ivory-billed woodpecker, a species that is possibly extinct but whose continued existence remains highly debated.

Synopsis 
After a birdwatcher videotaped a white-winged bird believed to be the Ivory-billed woodpecker, many birdwatchers came to visit Brinkley too see it for themselves. In February 2004, woodpecker gift shops opened in Brinkley. Filmmaker Scott Crocker gives a detailed look at each side of the argument in Brinkley, with interviews from both the locals and the tourists.

Critical reception 
Ghost Bird has received highly positive critical reception from all around North America. In 2010, the New York Times called it a "multilayered story that will fascinate practically everyone" and a "witty, wistful documentary". On Rotten Tomatoes it has a rating of 91%  based on 11 reviews, and was selected at the 2009 Hot Docs International Film Festival.

References

External links
 

2009 films
Woodpeckers
American documentary films
2000s English-language films
2000s American films